

Methodology 
The life expectancy is shown separately for males and for females, as well as a combined figure. Several non-sovereign entities and territories are also included in this list.

The figures reflect the quality of healthcare in the countries listed as well as other factors including HIV infections.

From the beginning of the current century there is a tendency to also estimate Healthy life expectancy (HALE) — the average number of years that a person can expect to live in "full health".

Comparing life expectancies across countries can be problematic, due to varying local standards in collecting statistics. This is especially true for Healthy life expectancy, as its definition and criteria can vary substantially, even – over time – within a country.

World Bank Group (2020) 
Data of the World Bank Group for 2020. The values in the World Bank Group tables are rounded. All calculations were done on raw data, therefore, due to the nuances of rounding, in some places illusory inconsistencies of indicators arose, with a size of 0.01 year.

United Nations (2021) 
Shown is the "period life expectancy" at birth. This is the average number of years a newborn would live if age-specific mortality rates in the current year were to stay the same throughout its life. The data is taken from the 2022 United Nations World Population Prospects. It is also used to calculate the Human Development Index

World Health Organization (2019) 
According to data published by World Health Organization in December 2020. By default, data is sorted by life expectancy at birth for all population, and in case of equal values by HALE for all population.

CIA World Factbook (2014-2020) 
The US CIA published the following life expectancy data in its World Factbook. ( it not oficial , the oficial data confirmed is from Group Bank and United Nations) the data so wrong and pointed at all.

World Bank Group (2014) 
Data of the World Bank Group for 2014.

See also

References

External links 
 Global Agewatch has the latest internationally comparable statistics on life expectancy from 195 countries.
Life expectancy trends interactive graph
 Life expectancy interactive world map
Global Life Expectancy (Infographic)|LiveScience
U.S. States life expectancy compared to the world (Infographic & Study)|Simply Insurance

Life expectancy
Life expectancy
Demographic lists